Garandu may refer to:
 Garandu, Jask (گرندو – Garandū)
 Garandu, Minab (گاراندو – Gārāndū)